West Loon Lake, Nova Scotia is small cottage and recreational community of rural Halifax Regional Municipality Nova Scotia situated at the northeastern corner of the municipality borders the counties of Pictou, and Colchester  and Municipal District of Saint Mary's at Trafalgar. A majority of the dwellings are cottages along Loon Lake, the lake which the community derives its name from. The community is on the St. Mary's Rd, between Route 336 and Route 374.

East Loon Lake Village
However, to access the community, one would have to drive through both Colchester and Guysborough County counties.

Navigator

References
HRM Civic Address Listing
East Loon Lake Village HRM Civic Address Office
Loon Lake HRM Civic Address Office
Explore HRM

Communities in Halifax, Nova Scotia
General Service Areas in Nova Scotia